Francesca da Rimini (aka Doll Yoko, aka GashGirl)  is an artist and cyberfeminist. With Josephine Starrs, Julianne Pierce, and Virginia Barratt she co-founded VNS Matrix. She has been working in new media since 1984.

References

20th-century Australian artists
New media artists
Living people
20th-century Australian women artists
21st-century Australian artists
21st-century Australian women artists
Year of birth missing (living people)